Hass Murad Pasha was an Ottoman statesman and commander of Byzantine Greek origin.

Origin
According to the 16th-century Ecthesis Chronica, Hass Murad and his brother, Mesih Pasha, were sons of a certain Gidos Palaiologos, identified by the contemporary Historia Turchesca as a brother of a Byzantine Emperor. This is commonly held to have been Constantine XI Palaiologos, the last Byzantine emperor, who fell during the fall of Constantinople to the Ottoman Sultan Mehmed II in 1453. If true, since Constantine XI died childless, and if the Ottomans had failed to conquer Constantinople, Mesih or Hass Murad might have succeeded him. The brothers were captured during the fall of Constantinople, converted to Islam, and raised as pages under the auspices of Sultan Mehmed II as part of the devşirme system. The exact identity of his father is unclear; Sphrantzes adds the name of "Thomas" to "Gidos", while several scholars, beginning with Martin Crusius, rather improbably equated the latter name to the Venetian "Guido", Latin "Vitus". However, neither Murad nor his brother can be identified with any of the known sons of Constantine XI's brothers who survived into adulthood—Thomas, Demetrios, and Theodore—leading Franz Babinger to suggest an illegitimate origin.

Career and death

In contrast to his brother, Murad's early life and career in Ottoman service are obscure. He must have enjoyed the favour of the Sultan—the sobriquet Hass, by which he is known, is an adjective meaning "private, personal" and designated intimacy and favour with a ruler—and wealthy, since in 1465/66 he began construction of a mosque in the Aksaray district of Constantinople, which was completed by his brother Mesih, who was eventually buried there. 

He seems to have held it until 1473, when he participated in a campaign against the Ak Koyunlu ruler Uzun Hassan in Anatolia, in which he was defeated and killed. During this campaign, he commanded the army's right wing a force of 20,000 men with 40 sanjakbeys. Uzun Hassan retreated before the Ottomans beyond the Euphrates. According to some Ottoman historians, Mahmud Pasha, who served under Murad's command, tried to warn him that the Ak Koyunlu were known to employ feigned retreats and that he should follow them cautiously, but Murad, who is portrayed as young, impetuous, and eager to claim glory for himself, did not heed him. Instead he moved ahead with part of his army, crossed the Euphrates, and was caught in an ambush on 4 August. The ensuing Battle of Tercan was a disaster for the Ottomans: Murad was killed—although Uzun Hassan's letter to the Doge of Venice claims that he was captured—along with a large part of the Ottoman army, while several distinguished commanders, including Turahanoğlu Ömer Bey and Fenarioğlu Ahmed Pasha, were taken prisoner. Other historians, however, including contemporary Greek and Latin sources, accuse Mahmud Pasha of knowing about the ambush and failing to warn Murad, because he was jealous of him.

References

Sources
 
 
 
 

1473 deaths
15th-century people from the Ottoman Empire
Converts to Islam from Eastern Orthodoxy
Ottoman military personnel killed in action
Devshirme
Former Greek Orthodox Christians
Greek Muslims
Greek slaves from the Ottoman Empire
People from the Ottoman Empire of Greek descent
Palaiologos dynasty
Pashas
Ottoman governors of Rumelia